Barke may refer to:

 Barke (film)
 Barke language, an Afro-Asiatic language

People with the surname
 Erich Barke
 Brady Barke
 Lloyd Barke
 Melton Barke
 Edmund Sonuga-Barke

Places 

 Barke, alternative name of Barca (ancient city)

See also 
 Barker (disambiguation)